Tau Alpha (τα) is a fraternity based in the "College of Engineering: at the "University of the Philippines" located in Diliman, Quezon City, Philippines. It was founded in 1932, one of the oldest fraternities in Asia.

Founding

In the early days of 1931, a group of undergraduates thought of forming a fraternity that would develop their leadership traits and bring about their social and civic responsibilities, and foster camaraderie and fraternalism in the pursuit of academic excellence and enhance their engineering professions. Dubbed Mu Epsilon, which stood for Manila Engineers, the fraternity was organized in the old Padre Faura grounds of Manila. Later on, upon the unanimous decision of the group that the fraternity should not be limited to the engineering students of Manila, its membership opened up  to all the students of the college. Thus came the search for the name that would best fit the principles of the group, and would also be the best to represent their aspirations and ideals. An appealing and inspirational name found was the Argonauts of Greek mythology.

The name Tau Alpha stands for The Argonauts. The fraternity originally had 50 members, matching the number of oars on the Argo, which was built by the first Greek engineer, Argos.

Tau Alpha was founded and officially recognized by the University on June 27, 1932, with Angel Francisco Gutierrez de Jesus as the first Grand High Alpha.

In the beginning, the principal factors in the selection of applicants were good moral character, and scholastic standing. Later, two other qualities were added leadership and a spirit of camaraderie. All these qualities showed themselves in the first University student elections in which Tau Alpha participated. All positions were won by the fraternity, including the first-ever Engineering Student Council Chairmanship.

Sorority
Tau Alpha is affiliated with the Tau Lambda Alpha sorority which was founded in 2012.

Service

Service by Tau Alpha includes the Tau Alpha Student Loan Guarantee Fund, Medical Missions, film showings, tree planting, Youth Build Blitz for Habitat for Humanity and  Bloodletting.

Tau Alpha also organizes the Argo Cup, one of the legs of the UP Barkada golf circuit. Tournament proceeds go to scholarships and other projects in the UP College of Engineering.

Notable alumni
 Gaudencio E. Antonino '32, Former Senator, 2nd Lieutenant (101st Engineer Bn.), 1st Lieutenant ( USAFFE & USAFIP)
 Mario Montejo '70, Secretary (Department of Science and Technology). He was conferred the Order of Sikatuna with the rank of Gold Cross Bayani by Pres. Aquino last 23 June 2016.
 Vicente Paterno '44, Former Senator, Former Representative to Batasang Pambansa, Board of Investments (Chairman), Minister of Industry (now DTI), Minister of Public Highways (now DPWH), Chairman and President of Philippine National Oil Company, Deputy Executive Secretary for Energy, Founder and President Philippine Seven Corporation (7/11)

References

Engineering fraternities and sororities in the Philippines
University of the Philippines
University of the Philippines Diliman
University of the Philippines Los Baños
UP Diliman College of Engineering
Fraternities and sororities in the Philippines
Student societies in the Philippines
Student organizations established in 1932